Home theater is a combination of audio and video components designed to recreate the experience of seeing movies in a theater. 

Home theater may also refer to:

 Home theater in a box, an integrated package of audio and video components
 Home theater PC, when a computer is part of a home theater